was a Japanese sumo wrestler, who is formally recognised as the third yokozuna. He came from Mutsu Province in the Sendai Domain (part of what is now Miyagi Prefecture).

Career
His height was 197 cm and his weight was 166 kg. He left Edo to fight in Osaka sumo. In Osaka, he debuted at west ōzeki in 1737. It is said that he lost only two bouts in his career.

He is considered to have been a strong wrestler but it has not been proven that he was awarded a yokozuna license. In honor of him, the house of Yoshida Tsukasa allowed him to be their disciple from August 1749 but this did not confer him the status of yokozuna. However, there are tales told that he wore a black-and-white rope. Though it was not a traditional shimenawa, Masahiko Nomi conjectured that it may have been related to the shimenawa.

Maruyama died in Nagasaki while an active sumo wrestler on November 14, 1749 possibly from dysentery. His grave lies in Nagasaki, Nagasaki Prefecture. A statue of him stands in Yoneyama, Tome, Miyagi.

It was not until over 150 years after his death that Maruyama was recognised as the third yokozuna by later yokozuna Jinmaku when he was compiling a formal list for a monument.

His life and career predate banzuke and tournament records, so no record of his rank and bouts exists.

See also
Glossary of sumo terms
List of yokozuna
List of past sumo wrestlers

References

External links

Brief biography

1713 births
1749 deaths
Japanese sumo wrestlers
Sumo people from Miyagi Prefecture
Yokozuna
Sumo wrestlers who died while active
18th-century wrestlers